St Mary Abbots Hospital was a hospital that operated from 1871 to 1992 at a site on Marloes Road in Kensington, London.

History
The hospital building, which was designed by Alfred Williams as a workhouse infirmary and built by John T. Chappell, was completed in 1871. It included a chapel dedicated to Saint Elizabeth of Hungary, whose foundation stone was laid on 17 April 1875 by Princess Louise, Duchess of Argyll. The hospital facilities became known as the Kensington Infirmary in 1912 and as St Mary Abbots Hospital in 1923.

The hospital was badly damaged during the London Blitz in 1940. Four people were killed and one of the blocks was destroyed, leaving an open bomb site within the hospital grounds.

In 1944, a V-1 flying bomb directly hit the hospital site. The infirmary building from 1871 was destroyed, along with the southern end of the original workhouse building from 1847 (known as Stone Hall). Five nurses, six children and seven adult patients died, while 33 additional casualties were transferred to St George's Hospital on Hyde Park Corner, with all remaining patients evacuated.

The hospital gradually recovered, and structural repairs were still being carried out when it was incorporated into the National Health Service in 1948. The Metropolitan Ear, Nose and Throat Hospital moved to the site in 1953. American musician Jimi Hendrix was pronounced dead at the hospital on 18 September 1970. 

In 1992, the hospital was closed and its remaining services were moved to the new Chelsea and Westminster Hospital in Fulham Road. The hospital site was subsequently redeveloped into a luxury housing estate called Kensington Green, which is a private gated community. The site's landscaped grounds are known as Stone Hall Gardens. At the centre of the site stands Stone Hall, a Jacobethan-style building that was constructed in 1847 as the main workhouse block and which now contains high-end residential apartments. The hospital's original gate posts, railings and gatehouse on Marloes Road survive at the entrance to the secure residential complex.

See also
 List of hospitals in England

References

Sources
 

Hospital buildings completed in 1871
Defunct hospitals in London
History of the Royal Borough of Kensington and Chelsea
Poor law infirmaries